Andre Anthony (born November 21, 1996) is an American football defensive end who is a free agent. He previously played college football at LSU.

Professional career

Tampa Bay Buccaneers
Anthony was drafted by the Tampa Bay Buccaneers in the seventh round, 248th overall, of the 2022 NFL Draft. He was waived on August 30, 2022.

Chicago Bears
Anthony signed with the Chicago Bears practice squad on September 12, 2022.

References

External links
 Tampa Bay Buccaneers bio
  LSU Tigers bio

1996 births
Living people
Players of American football from New Orleans
American football defensive ends
American football linebackers
LSU Tigers football players
Tampa Bay Buccaneers players
Chicago Bears players